Popular Publications was one of the largest publishers of pulp magazines during its existence, at one point publishing 42 different titles per month.  Company titles included detective, adventure, romance, and Western fiction.  They were also known for the several 'weird menace' titles.  They also published several pulp hero or character pulps.

History 
The company was formed in 1930 by Henry "Harry" Steeger. It was the time of the Great Depression, and Steeger had just read The Hound of the Baskervilles. Steeger realized that people wanted escapist fiction, allowing them to forget the difficulties of daily life.  Steeger wrote "I realised that a great deal of money could be made with that kind of material. It was not long before I was at it, inventing one pulp magazine after another, until my firm had originated over 300 of them."

In the late 1930s Steeger was under pressure to lower his rate of pay to below one cent a word, which he felt was the minimum decent rate he could offer.  He didn't want to have Popular pay less than one cent per word, so a new company, Fictioneers, was started; it was essentially a fictional company, with an address (205 East 42nd St) that corresponded to the rear entrance of Popular's offices at 210 East 43rd St.  It was given a separate phone number, and the switchboard girl was instructed to put calls through to staff working on Fictioneers titles only if the calls came to the Fictioneers number.  Many staff were working on magazines for both companies at the same time, which made it difficult to maintain the pretense of separation.  Science fiction writer Frederik Pohl, on the other hand, was hired specifically to edit two Fictioneers titles: Astonishing Stories and Super Science Stories.

In 1934, Popular acquired Adventure from the Butterick Company. Around the same time, the purchased a number of titles from Clayton Publications such as Ace-High Magazine and Complete Adventure Novelettes.  In 1940, they purchased Black Mask from The Pro-Distributors, Inc. In 1942 the firm acquired the properties of the Frank A. Munsey Company In 1949, they acquired all of the pulp titles Street & Smith had recently cancelled, with the exceptions of The Shadow (due to the radio show) and their other hero pulps, and Astounding, although Popular did not publish revivals of them all.

Other imprints used included Fictioneers, Inc. (1939–58), All-Fiction Field, Inc. (1942–58), New Publications, Inc. (1936–60), Recreational Reading (1936–60), and Post Periodicals, Inc. (1936–60).

In 1972, the company was sold to Brookside Publications, a company owned by advertising magnate David Geller.  At the time it was still publishing Argosy, Railroad, recently ending Adventure and True Adventure. In c. 1977, Geller sold Popular to French publisher Hachette. In 1981, they sold the rights to Joel Frieman who established Blazing Publications, which in 1988 renamed itself Argosy Communications, Inc. Under those names, it published a few comic-book versions of characters, as well as allowed the reprinting of several of their properties. In 2014 most of its titles–including all copyrights and associated intellectual property–were acquired by Steeger Properties, LLC, with Argosy Communications retaining only a few pulp heroes such as The Spider, G-8, and Operator #5.

Character magazines
 Captain Combat
 Captain Satan
 Captain V
 Captain Zero (considered the last hero pulp)
 Dr. Yen Sin (a Fu Manchu clone)
 Dusty Ayres and his Battle Birds
 G-8
 Wu Fang (a Fu Manchu clone)
 The Octopus/The Scorpion (one-shot villain pulps)
 Operator No. 5
 Secret 6
 The Spider

Other titles
 Ace-High Detective Magazine
 Ace-High Magazine
 Ace-High Novels Monthly
 Ace-High Western Magazine
 Ace-High Western Stories Magazine
 Adventure 
 All Aces Magazine
 All-American Fiction
 All-Star Love Magazine
 All-Story Detective
 All-Story
 All-Story Love
 All-Story Love Stories
 All-Story Love Tales
 All-Story Western
 A. Merritt’s Fantasy Magazine
 Argosy 
 Argosy All-Story Weekly
 Astonishing Stories
 Battle Aces
 Battle Birds
 Big-Book Detective Magazine
 Big-Book Western Magazine
 Big Chief Western
 Black Mask
 Blue Steel Magazine
 Bulls-Eye Western Stories
 Candid Confessions
 Cavalier Classics
 Complete Mystery Novelettes
 Confession Novel of the Month
 Cowboy Movie Thrillers
 Crack-Shot Western
 Dare-Devil Aces
 Daring Confessions
 Detective Action Stories
 Detective Dime Novels
 Detective Fiction
 Detective Fiction Weekly
 Detective Story Magazine
 Detective Tales
 Dime Adventure Magazine
 Dime Detective Magazine
 Dime Mystery Magazine
 Dime Mystery Book Magazine
 Dime Sports Magazine
 Dime Western Magazine
 Dr. Yen Sin
 Double Detective Magazine
 Dusty Ayres and His Battle Birds
 Everybody’s
 Famous Fantastic Mysteries
 Famous Spy Stories
 Fantastic Novels Magazine
 Fantasy Fiction
 Fantasy Stories
 F.B.I. Detective Stories
 Fifteen Detective Stories
 Fifteen Love Stories
 15 Mystery Stories
 Fifteen Range Romances
 Fifteen Sports Stories
 15 Story Detective
 Fifteen Western Tales
 Fifth Column Stories
 Fighting Aces
 Flynn’s
 Flynn’s Detective
 Flynn’s Detective Fiction
 Flynn’s Weekly
 Flynn’s Weekly Detective Fiction
 Focus Magazine
 Foreign Legion Adventures
 .44 Western Magazine
 Four Star Love Magazine
 Fun for All
 Fun for One
 Gang World
 G-8 and His Battle Aces
 Glamorous Love Stories
 Horror Stories
 Knockout Magazine
 The Live Wire
 Love Book Magazine
 Love-Crime Detective
 Love Novel of the Month
 Love Novelettes
 Love Novels
 Love Revelations
 Love Romantic Magazine
 Love Short Stories
 Love Story Magazine
 Lovers Magazine
 Mavericks
 Max Brand’s Western Magazine
 Men’s Pictorial
 Munsey’s Magazine
 The Mysterious Wu Fang
 New Detective Magazine
 The New Fiction Library
 New Love Magazine
 New Sports Magazine
 New Western Magazine
 The Octopus
 The Pecos Kid Western
 Pioneer Western
 Railroad Magazine
 Rangeland Love Stories
 Rangeland Romances
 Rangeland Sweethearts
 Red Star Detective
 Red Star Love Revelations
 Red Star Mystery
 Red Star Secret Confessions
 Red Star Western
 Romance Western
 Romance Western Roundup
 The Scorpion
 Sea Novel Magazine
 The Secret 6
 Shock
 Silver Buck Western
 Sinister Stories
 The Spider
 Sports Novels Magazine
 Star Western
 Startling Mystery Magazine
 Story Digest
 Strange Detective Mysteries
 Super Science Stories
 Sweetheart Love Stories
 10 Story Mystery Magazine
 10 Story Western Magazine
 Terror Tales
 Thrilling Mysteries
 True Adventures
 True Love
 True Love Affairs
 Underworld Love Stories
 Underworld Romances
 Walt Coburn’s Western Magazine
 Western Ace High Stories
 Western Dime Novels
 Western Love Romances
 The Western Raider
 Western Rangers
 Western Rangers Stories
 Western Story Magazine
 Western Story Roundup
 Western Tales

Footnotes

References
 Haining, Peter. The Fantastic Pulps. Vintage Books, a division of Random House. 1975. 

Pulp magazine publishing companies of the United States
Publishing companies established in 1930
Companies based in New York City
1930 establishments in New York City